Mariamman, often abbreviated to Amman, is a Hindu goddess of rain, predominantly venerated in the rural areas of South India. Her festivals are held during the late summer/early autumn season of Ādi throughout Tamil Nadu and the Deccan region, the largest being the Ādi Thiruviḻa. Her worship mainly focuses on bringing rains and curing diseases like cholera, smallpox, and chicken pox. Mariamman is worshipped in accordance with local traditions such as Pidari or the Gramadevatai. She is considered as a guardian deity (kaval deivam) by many South Indian village-dwellers.

Origin

Mariamman's worship originated in the traditions of Dravidian folk religion, the faith practised by the inhabitants of the south before its syncretism with Vedic Hinduism. She is the main Tamil mother goddess, predominantly venerated in the rural areas of South India. Mariamman has since been associated with Hindu goddesses like Parvati, Kali, Durga, Rukmini, Sita, Draupadi, as well as with her northern Indian counterpart Shitala, her eastern Indian counterpart, Olai Chandi, and her western Indian counterpart of Mogal mata.

The word Mari (pronunciation: /mɒri/) has the Sangam Tamil origin meaning "Rain", and the Dravidian root term Amman means "Mother". She was worshipped by the ancient Tamils as the bringer of rain and thus also the bringer of prosperity, since the abundance of their crops was dependent largely upon adequate rainfall. The cult of the mother goddess is treated as an indication of a society which venerated femininity. The temples of the Sangam days, mainly of Madurai, seem to have had priestesses to the deity, which also appear predominantly as goddesses. In Sangam literature, there is an elaborate description of the rites performed by the Kurava priestess in the shrine Palamutircholai.

Iconography
Mariamman is usually pictured as a beautiful young woman with a red-hued face, wearing a red dress. Sometimes she is portrayed with many arms—representing her many powers—but in most representations she has only two or four.

Mariamman is generally portrayed in the sitting or standing position, often holding a trident (trisula) in one hand and a bowl (kapala) in the other. One of her hands may display a mudra, usually the abhaya mudra, to ward off fear. She may be represented with two demeanours—one displaying her pleasant nature, and the other her terrifying aspect, with fangs and a wild mane of hair.

Legends

The origin of the goddess Mariamman in terms of a consistent and coherent legend has not been standardised, but several myths of the mother goddess exist in several regional traditions that are spread orally throughout South India.

According to a regional Hindu legend, there was once a beautiful woman named Nagavalli, wife to a rishi named Piruhu. When the rishi was away, the Trimurti, the deities of Brahma, Vishnu, and Shiva, visited her, seeking to decide for themselves if she was truly as beautiful and virtuous as she was supposed to be. Nagavalli, not recognising them, and resenting their intrusion, turned them into children with her powers. The deities were infuriated and cursed her, causing her face to become disfigured with smallpox. When Piruhu returned, he drove her away, informing her that she would be born on earth, causing her affliction to human beings as well.

According to the Vanniyar community, an agrarian class, Draupadi, the common wife of the Pandavas, is said to be an incarnation of the goddess Shakti. Draupadi, despite being Shakti, lived like a normal woman, suppressing her supernatural powers. While they were in exile, when the Pandavas were asleep at night, she would travel to the villages of Vanniyar in the form of a fierce looking Goddess. Vanniyars would offer her prayers and barley, which pleased her. In time, she would be called Mariamman (the mother of rain and curing diseases), and became popular in the Vanniyar villages.

According to the narrative of the higher varnas, there was once a pariah boy who impersonated a Brahmin suitor in order to marry a Brahmin girl. This lie is discovered by the girl when she discerns the jargon and non-vegetarian habits of her in-laws. In order to ritually purify herself from the pollution of being married to a low-born pariah, the girl self-immolates. This Brahmin girl is deified and named as Mariamman, and becomes the goddess of the pariahs.

In northern India, Shitala is worshipped in a similar way, predominantly by the Rajput/Kshatriya community. Shitala has a legend and plays a similar role in protecting villages from diseases.

Roles

Goddess of medicine 
Mariamman cures all so-called "heat-based" diseases like pox and rashes. During the summer months in South India (March to June), people walk miles carrying pots of water mixed with turmeric and neem leaves to ward off illnesses like the measles and chicken pox. In this way the goddess Mariamman is very similar to the North Indian goddess Shitaladevi.

Fertility goddess 
Devotees also pray to Mariamman for familial welfare such as fertility, healthy progeny or a good spouse. The most favoured offering is "pongal", a mix of rice and green gram, cooked mostly in the temple complex, or shrine itself, in terracotta pots using firewood.

Some festivals in honour of the goddess Mariamman involve night-time processions of devotees carrying oil lamps. Mariamman is the family deity for many in the Thanjavur district of Tamil Nadu. It is a custom initially to worship the family deity on occasions such as weddings. The worship of a 'family deity' (kuladevata), considered most important in any Hindu festival, continues down the generations, providing a clue to the family's origin, since the family deities are usually located within the vicinity of the village to which the family originally belonged.

Worship
The worshipping methods are often accompanied by various kinds of folk dancing. Offerings such as pongal and koozh that are cooked using earthen pots are also made during the festive season. Rituals such as fire walking and mouth or nose piercing are also practised.

At the Samayapuram Mariamman Temple in Samayapuram, the Hindu system of worship is still seen today for the worship of Mariyamman, which involves a ten-day festival organized by temple authorities during the second week in April. Some continue to use an old village custom of worship by offering chickens and goats to the deity, though the animals are no longer sacrificed but sold after being offered. The main worship of the goddess occurs on the road a mile or two from the temple.  A hurried walk and dance carry hundreds of thousands of worshippers along the road to the temple. Many in the crowd have fasted, shaved their heads, and wear bright yellow clothes which are sacred to the goddess.  Women and children may carry a pot on their heads decorated with the goddess's favourite leaves, of the margosa tree. Young men and women, carrying similar pots, are followed by drummers and dance more wildly. Larger men and women carry pots of charcoal fire. Some put themselves through a special tribulation of having one of the sacred weapons, dagger, trident, or spear, inserted through their cheeks or tongues. Through this worship each individual achieves self-realization and awareness of others through samsara and moksha. In this self-realization a bonding with the goddess occurs, which is the underlining reason for the worship.

Mulaikottu 
Mulaikottu is a village festival celebrated in southern Tamil Nadu, particularly in villages of Madurai, Sivagangai, Dindugul, Ramanathapuram, Thoothukudi and Thirunelveli districts.  By doing so they believe that they can get her blessing and sufficient rain for better cultivation. This festival is generally celebrated in between Any Tamil month of panguni to Purattasi. The festival lasts for 11 days. (Sunday of first week to Wednesday of second week)

On the auspicious beginning of the village festival, a village meeting will be convened to sort out the best suitable date for the celebration of Mulaikottu. Before fixing any date, the pradhan and secretary of the village gather some information from the villagers regarding any marriage or anyone suffering from chicken pox etc. If anyone is affected by chicken pox, any sudden death occurred or someone's marriage is taking place, under these circumstances the date of mulaikottu will be either postponed or cancelled according to the public opinion at the meeting. The celebration begins with collection of nine different types of grain seeds from every house, called thandal in Tamil. The Thandal will held in Sunday of Valarpirai. The following Tuesday is the second day of thandal called Pari parapputhal. Next Tuesday, the main function is held on the day called mulaikottu. On the next day of thandal, the temple committee distribute the grains to every house for setting up of pari.

The pari is a clay pot with a wide mouth and narrow base with a hole in the bottom. This utensil is specially made for this purpose and sold at the market. The villagers visit the market and purchase number of paris as they wanted to setup in their home.

The first step to set them up is to clean paris and their home the second day of thandal. People used to collect goat dung and some hay. The hay is used to block the hole of the pari. A layer of goat dung is spread over the hay and watered to make the dung wet. This is the procedure of setting up up of pari.

As a next step to this, the received nine type of grains from the temple committee, is smoothly spread over the goat dung on the pari. Following this, a pooja will be arranged for praying the goddess to make the pari a successful one. Every house may have more than two paries. These paries taken into a dark and isolated room in their house. For the next seven days they have to grow the seedlings into a plant. Usage of loudspeaker and crackers are completely banned during this period. During evening, all villagers assemble in front of the Mariamman temple and sing folk songs known as mari pattu and dance folk dances such as mulaikottu ( similar to kummi), Amman oyil. It is followed everyday from thandal Sunday (First day) to next Sunday (eighth day). The ninth day called thangal, means camping. On this day the temple is closed and folk poojas and dances are prohibited. The Amman karagam is made in village water body and the person who fasts in those 10 days is called Ammadi (The person who depicted as Amman). The amandi takes the karagam and gave to temple. All paris are brought into the Amman temple from the houses on the tenth day of thandal. The paris remain in the Amman temple for one night and on the next day (the last day, eleventh day, Wednesday), and after a pooja, the paries will be issued back to their respective member. The Ammadi again takes karagam and the mulaiparis are also taken from the temple. Finally, the amman Karagam and mulaiparis are submerged into the village pond. It is also celebrated in Madurai amman temple on the Tamil month of Aadi.

Temples

Most temples to Mariamman are simple village shrines, where both male and female priests perform sacred rituals. In many rural shrines, the goddess is represented by a granite stone with a sharp tip, like a spear head. This stone is often adorned with garlands made of limes and with red flowers. These shrines often have an anthill that could be the resting place of a cobra. Milk and eggs are offered to propitiate the snake.

Some temples have attained sufficient popularity for Brahmins to officiate at them. For example, the Samayapuram Mariamman near the shore of river Cauvery in the northern outskirts of Trichy, maintains a rich agamic tradition and all rituals are performed by Gurukkals.

Punainallur, near Thanjavur (Tanjore), is the location of another famous Mariamman temple. Legend says that Mariamman appeared to the King Venkoji Maharaja Chatrapati (1676–1688) of Tanjore in his dreams and told him she was in a forest of Punna trees three miles distant from Tanjore. The King rushed to the spot and recovered an idol from the jungle. On the king's orders a temple was constructed there, the idol installed, and the place was called Punnainallur. Hence the deity of this temple is known as Punnainallur Mariamman. Mud replicas of different parts of the human body are placed in the temple as offerings by devotees pleading for cure. It is said that the daughter of Tulaja Raja (1729–35) of Tanjore, who lost her eyesight due to illness, regained it after worshipping at this temple. Shri Sadasiva Brahmendra is said to have made the Moola Murthy of the Goddess Maariamman from the mud from the ant-hill where snakes had resided.

Salem Kottai Sri Periya Mariamman temple which is located in the heart of the city, the Aadi festival celebrated for 22 days.

The Erode Mariamman temple festival is a grand one in Tamil Nadu. The worship of three Mariamman goddesses named Small, Medium and Large Mariamman (residing at three separate localities within the city) is combined in a festival every April. It features the thiruvilla, along with all the other devotions to God, and ends at the Cauvery river with the purificatory immersion of the kambam (effigy of Mariamman's husband) in the flowing waters of the river.

The Karur Mariamman temple festival, which is celebrated at the end of May each year, is another notable festival held in honour of the goddess in Tamil Nadu.

Other important temples of Mariamman in Tamil Nadu are in the towns of Veerapandi, Theni, Anbil (near Trichy), Narthamalai, Thiruverkadu, Salem, Virudhunagar and Sivakasi, Vellore. In Chennai (Madras), a famous Mariamman temple is the Putthu Mariamman: the eponymous Putthu (ant-hill) being located across the road from the temple on the opposite side of the Velachery Main Road.

In 2012, the singer Harini composed a song about the Samayapuram Mariamman deity which was featured on the album Om Nava Sakthi Jaya Jaya Sakthi. The song narrates the power of Shakti as Samayapuram Amman and equates the Peruvalai River with Punya Theertham, as do the people in that area.

Madurai is home to the Theppakulam sri Mariamman Temple, a noted focus of devotion, primarily to the goddess but also to the Maruthuvachi (= doctor/midwife). Periyachi Amman (or Pechi Amman), who was deified for her skill and heroism. The temple possesses a large theppakulam. Here the  Panguni festival is the main event of the religious calendar. The devotees of The goddess Mariamman observe the "poo choridhal" flower festival, and in the month of Aadi many women honour her with fasting and prayer.

Another famous Mariamman temple is situated in the state of Karnataka, in the town of Kaup, seven kilometres from the famous temple town of Udipi.

There is also a famous and highly regarded Mariamman temple in Urwa, a residential area of the city of Mangalore, where through the power of the goddess many miracles have been reported to occur. The temple is known familiarly as Urwa Marigudi.

Outside India

 Arulmigou Shri Madhur Kannanour Mariamman Thirukkovil, Port-Louis in Mauritius
 Mariamman Temple, Ho Chi Minh City in Vietnam
 Mariamman Temple, Bangkok in Thailand
 Mariamman Temple, Pretoria
 Punnainallur Mariamman
 Samayapuram Mariamman Temple
 Sri Mahamariamman Temple, Kuala Lumpur, Malaysia
 Sri Mariamman Temple, Medan, Indonesia
 Sri MahaMariamman Temple, Penang, Malaysia
 Sri Mariamman Temple, Singapore
 Sri MuthuMariamman Temple, Negombo
 Mariamman Temple, Pretoria
 Matale Sri Muthumariyamman Temple, Matale-Sri Lanka

There are many Mariamman temples outside India, in Mauritius, Sri Lanka (Mari Mata Temple Rattan Tallow Akbar Road Saddar Karachi Pakistan, in Karachi 5 Mari Mata Temples, Rattan Tallow Temple Soyam Parghat Temple. In Karachi five temples of Mari Mata). Malaysia, Singapore, Thailand, Fiji, Fiji Maha Shakti Mata Temple Nadi and Suva, Guyana, Vietnam, Trinidad and Tobago, Germany and South Africa, the product of efforts of the Tamil diaspora. Some notable temples include the Sri Mariamman temple in Singapore, Sri Mariamman temple in Bangkok, a Mariamman temple in Pretoria, South Africa, as well as one in Sri Mariamman Temple, Medan, Sri Mariamman Temple Karachi Pakistan, (Marathi Peoples Calling=Mari Aayi)(Shri Mari Mata Temple Rattan Tallow Akbar Road Saddar Karachi Pakistan.) Indonesia.

There are also many Mariamman temple in every state of Malaysia. Some notable temples include the Queen Street Sri MahaMariamman Temple, Penang in George Town, Sri Sithala Maha Mariamman Temple, Pekan Getah Tapah, Lorong Kulit Sri Muthu Mariamman Temple in George Town, Sri Rudra Verra Muthu MahaMariamman Temple in Air Itam, Sri Maha Mariamman Devasthanam in Arau, Sri Maha Mariamman Devasthanam in Alor Setar, Sri Maha Mariamman Temple in Sungai Petani,  Sri Maha Mariamman Temple in Ipoh, Sri Nagamuthu Mariamman Temple in Taiping, Sri Maha Mariamman Temple in Gopeng, Sri MahaMariamman Temple, Kuala Lumpur, Sri Maha Mariamman Temple in Klang, Sri Maha Mariamman Temple in Chukai, Sri Maha Mariamman Temple in Port Dickson, Sri Maha Mariamman Temple in Kuantan, Sri Veera Sundara Muthu Mariamman in Kulim, Raja Mariamman Temple in Johor Bahru, Sri Maha Muthu Mariamman Temple in Tumpat, Sri Maha Mariamman Temple in Kuching, Sri Maha Mariamman Temple in Sibu, and Sri Muthu Mariamman Temple, Kampung Chetti, Melaka.

Gallery

Syncretism
Among the Malbars of the French island Réunion, a syncretism of Catholicism and Hinduism has developed.

See also
 Draupadi Amman
 Isakki
 Kateri Amman
 Madurai Veeran
 Maisamma
 Mari (goddess)
 Pidari

Citations

General references 
 Kolenda, Pauline. "Pox and the Terror of Childlessness: Images and Ideas of the Smallpox Goddess in a North Indian Village" in P. Kolenda, Caste, Cult and Hierarchy: Essays on the Culture of India. New Delhi: Folklore Institute, 1983. pp. 198–221.
 Rigopoulos, Antonio. The life and teachings of Sai Baba of Shirdi. Albany: State University of New York Press, 1993. . pp. 78, 80, 160, 224, 226, 250.

External links

 
Consorts of Shiva
Forms of Parvati
Mother goddesses
Health goddesses
Rain deities
Smallpox deities
Tamil deities
Medicine goddesses
Plague gods